Elfriede Kuzmany (1915–2006) was an Austrian film and television actress.

Selected filmography
 The Falling Star (1950)
 House of Life (1952)
 The River Line (1964)
 The Sternstein Manor (1976)
 Der Schatz im Niemandsland (1987, TV miniseries)

References

Bibliography
 Parrill, Sue & Robison, William B. The Tudors on Film and Television. McFarland, 2013.

External links

1915 births
2006 deaths
Austrian film actresses
Austrian television actresses
Austrian people of German Bohemian descent
German Bohemian people
People from Rychnov nad Kněžnou District